Pawa or pawva may refer to:

PAWA Dominicana, Caribbean Airline
Pawa, Pakistan, one of the 51 Union Councils of Abbottabad District in the Khyber Pakhtunkhwa province of Pakistan 
Paua, Maori word for the abalone